Robert Erbele (born September 30, 1952) is an American politician. He is a member of the North Dakota State Senate from the 28th District, serving since 2001. He is a member of the Republican party.

References

Living people
1952 births
Republican Party North Dakota state senators
People from Jamestown, North Dakota
21st-century American politicians